The Ministry of Investment Promotion is the Sri Lankan government ministry.

List of ministers

The Minister of Investment Promotion is an appointment in the Cabinet of Sri Lanka.

Parties

See also
 List of ministries of Sri Lanka

References

External links
 Government of Sri Lanka

Investment Promotion
Investment Promotion
Investment promotion agencies